All Saints' Church, Stamford is a parish church in the Church of England, situated in Stamford, Lincolnshire, England. It is a Grade I listed building. The church is on the north side of Red Lion Square which was part of the route of the A1 until the opening of the Stamford bypass in 1960.

History

A Stamford church is mentioned in the Domesday Book. None of the original church is still in existence.  There is a very small amount of 12th-century stonework, but the bulk of the church dates from the 13th century. Of that date is the exterior blind arcading, an unusual feature in a parish church.

Extensive additions were made by the Browne family in the 15th century. John Browne, Merchant of the Staple of Calais, funded the 15th-century construction.  His son, William, Mayor of the Calais Staple, funded and built the steeple. Members of the Browne family are the only people buried inside the church. The late-15th century work is of "considerable inventiveness" in its use of architectural details such as ornamental battlements.

William Stukeley was vicar from 1730 to 1747.

Organ
The  1890 Hill organ was rebuilt in 1916 by James Jepson Binns.

Organists

Frederick Ries Barratt 1837 - 1840 
Mr Shearman until 1847
Miss Burton from 1847
Frank Ketcher until 1883 (afterwards organist of St Deiniol's Church, Hawarden)
George Fletcher 1883 - 1885
Haydon Hare 1885 - 1895 (afterwards organist of St Nicholas' Church, Great Yarmouth)
Bertie Hare 1895 - 1907
Mr. Murrell from 1907 (formerly organist at Ramsey)
T. Robins 1929 - 1940 (afterwards organist at Chagford, Devon)
Wilfred A. Stevens 1929 - 1940 (formerly assistant organist at Peterborough Cathedral, afterwards organist of St John’s Peterborough)
Albert T.C. Hill 1940 - 1962 (formerly organist at Bourne Abbey)
Harold Harvey 1962 - ca. 1987
Jeffrey Beeden 1997 - 2008
Jeremy Jepson 2000 - 2011 (previously St George's Chapel, Windsor Castle)
Anthony Wilson 2011 - 2012
Michael Kee 2012 - 2013
Fergus Black 2014 - 2020
Jeremy Jepson from 2021

References

External links

Church of England church buildings in Lincolnshire
Grade I listed churches in Lincolnshire
13th-century church buildings in England
Churches in Stamford, Lincolnshire